Leonardo Nigro (Born 15 February 1974 in Italy) is a Swiss actor.

Early life 
Leonardo Nigro is a Swiss Italian actor and grew up in Zurich, Switzerland. His parents are Italian migrants. From 1994 to 1996 he attended acting school in Zurich, Switzerland and then played several roles on stages in Basel, Berlin, Hamburg und Dresden. His first TV main role was for the German TV show , followed by many roles in shows such as Tatort, Die Wache or Ein Fall für zwei. He also starred as leading actor in the Swiss Television series Schöni Uussichte and Tag und Nacht.

For his performance, he was awarded the TV Filmprice for Best Actor in "Tod in der Lochmatt" and Best Supporting Act in Oro Verde. For his role in Sinestesia he has received the Salento Film Award and for his performance in Going Private the "Swiss Filmprice" as Best Ensemble. He also played in On the Line (Auf der Strecke) that was nominated for the Academy Awards in the category best short movie.

Leonardo Nigro is in a relationship with Mayumi Steiner since 1999 and they have a son since June 2012.

Filmography

Film (selection) 
 2002: Blue Hope
 2005: Antibodies
 2006: Grounding – The Last Days of Swissair
 2006: Handyman
 2006: Going Private
 2007: Auf der Strecke
 2009: Der Fürsorger
 2009: Länger Leben
 2009: 
 2009: Sinestesia
 2010:  2010: Cosa voglio di più 2011:  2010: Il Venditore di Medicine 2013:  2013: F2014 2013: Oro Verde 2014: Take Control 2014: Vecchi Pazzi 2014: Schellenursli Television 
 2002: Und die Braut wusste von nichts 2004: Piff paff puff 2006: Ein Fall für zwei – Doppelpass (episode 235)
 2007: Chubby Me 2007: Schöni Uussichte 2007: Tod in der Lochmatt 2008: Dr. Psycho – Die Bösen, die Bullen, meine Frau und ich (season 2, episodes 1 and 2)
 2008:  2009: Flug in die Nacht – Das Unglück von Überlingen 2009: Tatort –  (episode 744)
 2010: Die Käserei in Goldingen 2013: Leipzig Homicide – Graf Porno''
 2020: ‘’30 Monedas’’

References

External links 
 
 «dasImperium.com»
 Portrait auf «swissfilms.ch»
 Interview mit Leonardo Nigro auf «outnow.ch»

Living people
1974 births
20th-century Swiss male actors
Male actors from Zürich
Swiss male film actors